The 2023–24 UEFA Europa Conference League will be the third season of the UEFA Europa Conference League, Europe's tertiary club football tournament organised by UEFA.

The final will be played at the yet to be announced venue. The winners of the tournament will automatically qualify for the 2024–25 UEFA Europa League league stage, unless they qualify for the 2024–25 UEFA Champions League through their league performance.

This edition will be the final season with the current format of 32 teams participating at the group stage, after UEFA announced that a brand new format would be introduced for the following edition.

Association team allocation
A total of 177 teams from 54 of the 55 UEFA member associations (excluding Russia) will participate in the 2023–24 UEFA Europa Conference League. The association ranking based on the UEFA country coefficients is used to determine the number of participating teams for each association:
Associations 1–5 each have one team qualify.
Associations 6–16 (except Russia) and 51–55 each have two teams qualify.
Associations 17–50 (except Liechtenstein) each have three teams qualify.
Liechtenstein have one team qualify as they organize only a domestic cup and no domestic league.
Moreover, 18 teams eliminated from the 2022–23 UEFA Champions League and 25 teams eliminated from the 2022–23 UEFA Europa League are transferred to the Europa Conference League.

Association ranking
For the 2023–24 UEFA Europa Conference League, the associations are allocated places according to their 2022 UEFA country coefficients, which takes into account their performance in European competitions from 2017–18 to 2021–22.

Apart from the allocation based on the country coefficients, associations may have additional teams participating in the Europa Conference League, as noted below:
 – Additional teams transferred from the UEFA Champions League
 – Additional teams transferred from the UEFA Europa League

Distribution
The following is the access list for this season.

Due to the suspension of Russia for the 2023–24 European season, the following changes to the access list have been made:

 The cup winners of association 16 (Czech Republic) enter the Europa League third qualifying round instead of the second qualifying round.
 One of the Champions League first qualifying round losers enter the third qualifying round instead of the second qualifying round.
 The cup winners of associations 17 to 19 (Norway, Denmark and Croatia) enter the third qualifying round instead of the second qualifying round.
 The cup winners of associations 30 to 39 (Slovakia, Slovenia, Belarus, Moldova, Lithuania, Bosnia and Herzegovina, Finland, Luxembourg, Latvia and Kosovo) enter the second qualifying round instead of the first qualifying round.

Teams

The labels in the parentheses show how each team qualified for the place of its starting round:
The labels in the parentheses show how each team qualified for the place of its starting round:
CW: Domestic cup winners
2nd, 3rd, 4th, 5th, 6th, etc.: League position of the previous season
LC: League cup winners

PW: End-of-season Europa Conference League play-offs winners
UCL: Transferred from the Champions League
Q1: Losers from the first qualifying round
PR: Losers from the preliminary round (F: final; SF: semi-finals)
UEL: Transferred from the Europa League
GS: Third-placed teams from the group stage
PO: Losers from the play-off round
CH/MP Q3: Losers from the third qualifying round (Champions/Main Path)

The second qualifying round, third qualifying round and play-off round are divided into Champions Path (CH) and Main Path (MP).

Note: Teams in italics may still qualify for the 2023–24 UEFA Champions League or 2023–24 UEFA Europa League.CC: 2023 UEFA club coefficients.''

Notes

Schedule
The schedule of the competition is as follows. Matches are scheduled for Thursdays apart from the final, which takes place on a Wednesday, though exceptionally can take place on Tuesdays or Wednesdays due to scheduling conflicts.

See also
2023–24 UEFA Champions League
2023–24 UEFA Europa League
2024 UEFA Super Cup
2023–24 UEFA Women's Champions League
2023–24 UEFA Youth League

References

External links

 
3
2023–24
Scheduled association football competitions